The Kla Party is a political party in Thailand. Its leader is Korn Chatikavanij, a former member of the Democrat Party. in 2022 they filed Candidates for the Bangkok metropolitan council election but failing to win any Seats only getting 53,232 votes 2,32% the Leader Korn Chatikavanij announced on 26 September 2022 thai pbs News said that Kla Party and the Chart Pattana Party (2007) had joined together to become Chart pattana Kla Party as a political alliance for competing in the Next Thai general election in 2023 but they would not merge together many other parties are scrambling together the Chart Pattana Party (2007) has 4 members of parliament and Kla party 0 the Chart Pattana Party (2007) won only 0.70% in 2019 so they hey lose more votes in 2023 since they have been losing support since 2011 Korn Chatikavanij is polling 2,12% for prime minister and polled as much as 3,78% the party wants to legalize gambling to bust the economy in Thailand. Maybe some other party’s will join the alliance since the 150 party party lists candidates was lowered to 100 in September 2021 the Kla party will maybe win 1 seats in 2023 if they are lucky. The party will probably be led by Korn Chatikavanij for prime minister in the election but Korn Chatikavanij is only polling 1,5% - 2.5% normally in polls

References 

Political parties in Thailand
Political parties established in 2020